The 2007–08 season was Norwich City's third consecutive year in the Football League Championship. This article shows statistics and lists all matches that Norwich City played in the season.

Season summary
Norwich had a busy summer with Peter Grant bringing in 9 players, which included goalkeeper David Marshall and former players Jamie Cureton and Darel Russell making returns to Carrow Road. 10 players departed Norwich, most notably Dickson Etuhu and Robert Earnshaw, while Darren Huckerby caused controversy by criticizing the club for selling their best players.

Norwich started off with a goalless draw away at Preston and a 2–1 win over Southampton, but after this Norwich endured a horrendous run of form, winning 1 league game in 8. After a 1–0 away defeat to QPR, Grant and City parted company by mutual consent.

Jim Duffy took over as caretaker boss, but lost his 3 games in charge.

On 30 October, Glenn Roeder was appointed as Grant's successor with the team bottom of the table. His first game was the East Anglian Derby against Ipswich, a 2–2 draw with Norwich coming back from 2–0 down. Norwich lost their next 2 games, including a dreadful 3–0 defeat away at Plymouth Argyle, and were 8 points away from safety. After that defeat Roeder brought in Matty Pattison, Mo Camara and Ched Evans on loan to add to the loan signing of Martin Taylor, who had been signed before the game against Ipswich (Pattison's loan move was made permanent in January). Norwich's form improved greatly, with only one defeat in eleven league games. After a 3–1 win over Barnsley on 12 January Norwich were in 18th position, four points clear of the relegation zone. Roeder began an overhaul of the squad during the January transfer window, selling Chris Brown to Preston and releasing David Strihavka, Julien Brellier and Ian Murray, all of whom had been signed by Grant and who had not figured in the first team since the defeat at Plymouth.

Results

Pre-season friendlies

League

August

September

October

November

December

January

February

March

April

May

FA Cup

League Cup

Transfers

Transfers in

Loans in

Transfers out

Loans out

Players

First team squad
Squad at end of season

Left club during season

Board and staff members

Board members

Coaching staff

Final league table

Notes

References

Norwich City F.C. seasons
Norwich City